Agalawatta is a suburb of Matale in Matale District, Central Province, Sri Lanka.

History
The inhabitants of Agalawatta supplied iron and saltpeter to the "Aramadula" in the periods of Dutch Ceylon and British Ceylon, according to Archibald Campbell Lawrie's 1896 gazetteer of the province.

Demographics

See also
List of towns in Central Province, Sri Lanka

External links

References

Populated places in Matale District